The Ballymun Flats referred to a number of flats—including the seven Ballymun tower blocks—in Ballymun, Dublin, Ireland. Built rapidly in the 1960s, there were 36 blocks in total, consisting of seven 15-storey, nineteen eight-storey, and ten four-storey blocks. The complex was built in a Corbusian style known as towers in the park, which was popular in European and American cities in the mid-20th century.

The 15-storey blocks actually had 17 storeys, including the entrance floor and a plant room on their roofs. Joseph Plunkett tower, named after one of the signatories of the Proclamation of the Irish Republic, was typical of the taller tower blocks. It was a 42-metre, 8,500-tonne building that housed 90 families in 30 three-, two-, and one-bedroom units.

The entire complex was demolished in the early 21st century. By October 2013, there were just three remaining blocks, all of which were empty. The last block was demolished in September 2015.

History

The Ballymun Flats were built in the 1960s to accommodate the rising population, particularly to accommodate former residents of inner-city areas which were being cleared in the process of 1960s urban slum clearances. Whilst suffering from a lack of sufficient public amenities, several schools served the area (Holy Spirit N.S. and Ballymun Comprehensive), as well as an Eastern Health Board medical centre and a purpose built shopping centre. The area suffered from many social problems such as drugs and rampant crime. The causes of these social problems, and the subsequent discrimination faced by many people with Ballymun addresses when seeking employment outside the suburb, have been disputed, but Ballymun generally paralleled the experience of many working-class people in the 1960 and 1970s when placed in high-rise locations.

Despite the negative perceptions of many non-residents of Ballymun, many of the residents insist that there is a strong sense of pride and community in the area. Lynn Connolly, whose 2006 memoir The Mun: Growing Up in Ballymun detailed her raising there in the 1970s and 1980s, readily acknowledged the problems there and wanted to get out at the time. But she later came to realise that there had been much that was good at the towers – in terms of a collective wit among residents and a helping sense of community – which had been ignored by the media.

The Ballymun Flats were the first homes with cable television in Ireland. RTÉ Relays Ltd, a subsidiary of the national broadcaster RTÉ, installed cable television into the flats in 1963, giving each residence access to Irish stations such as RTÉ Television and UK stations such as BBC One, BBC Two, ITV, and from 1982, Channel 4.

Four-storey flats

The four-storey flats were situated on Sandyhill Avenue, Sillogue Avenue, and Shangan Avenue. They were the earliest complexes to be demolished. The former flats of Sillogue Avenue are now open land, whilst the former flats of Shangan Avenue have been replaced by new complexes. A new area called Marewood, consisting of houses and apartments, is now situated where the Sandyhill Avenue flats once stood.

Eight-storey flats

The eight-storey flats were situated along Balbutcher Lane, where there were two blocks; Shangan Road, where there were three blocks; Coultry Road, where there were four blocks; and Balcurris and Sillogue Roads, each of which had five blocks.

The flats had two different designs, the more common being with the lift on the opposite side of the stairwell, Balbutcher and Shangan were the only ones to feature this design. Balcurris contained one of the alternative blocks, Sillogue contained the alternative blocks and three of the other blocks, three of the four Coultry blocks were made contained the lift on the side of the stairwell. Balcurris was the only row of flats to have its blocks separated by a road, the latter three blocks faced a different direction to the first two blocks and were the most visible from Dublin Airport.

Balbutcher Lane was upgraded in the 1990s where only residents were allowed to enter and had to buzz their way in, visitors needed permission from residents in order to enter. Windows were placed on the balconies and post would be delivered similar to how an apartment block would receive their mail. Railings were also placed around the flats and a playground was built at the back of the complex.

Sections of Coultry and Balcurris were demolished first, with the latter becoming the first complex to be completely demolished by 2009, it was originally noted that the Ballymun Shopping Centre and Metro North would be situated on the old Balcurris site, although these plans failed to materialize. Many of the complexes were demolished by 2012, after the removal of the Sillogue flats. Balbutcher Lane were the last eight-storey flats to go in 2015.

Fifteen-story flats

The Ballymun tower blocks were seven landmark residential towers built in the 1960s. The seven towers were named after the seven leaders of the 1916 rising; Patrick Pearse, Thomas MacDonagh, Seán Mac Diarmada, Éamonn Ceannt, Thomas Clarke, James Connolly, and Joseph Plunkett.

In 2004, demolition of the first tower began. The Pearse tower was demolished slowly by mechanical means, whilst MacDermott and MacDonagh Towers were demolished by controlled implosion. Ceannt, Plunkett, Clarke, and Connolly towers were demolished by mechanical means.

The red aircraft warning lights on these structures were not connected to any form of back-up power for many years, leaving the towers completely dark in a power outage.

Construction/Demolition
Patrick Pearse tower (1966–2004) was the first tower to be erected, in 1966. It was halfway through construction when the construction of MacDonagh Tower started. Pearse Tower was the first one to be demolished in 2004.
Thomas MacDonagh tower (1966–2005) was the second tower, built in 1966, and in 2005 was demolished by controlled implosion.
Éamonn Ceannt tower (1966–2005) was the third tower, built in 1966; in 2005 it was demolished.
James Connolly tower (1966–2007) was the fourth tower, built in 1966. In 2007 it was demolished.
Seán MacDermott tower (Seán Mac Diarmada) (1966–2005) was the fifth tower to be built, in 1966. In 2005, it was demolished by controlled implosion and collapsed in less than eight seconds.
Thomas Clarke tower (1966–2008) was the sixth tower, built in 1966. Before it was demolished in 2008, the top floor was turned into a short-stay hotel.
Joseph Plunkett tower (1967–2015) was the last one built, in 1967. The tower's demolition began on 22 September 2015.

Gallery

In popular culture
 The line "I see seven towers, but I only see one way out" from U2's 1987 song "Running to Stand Still" (on The Joshua Tree album) refers to these towers. The link between the towers and the song was pervasive enough to be mentioned in some tourist books about Dublin.
 Ballymun flats feature in M. J. Hyland's Booker-shortlisted novel Carry Me Down (2006), symbolising John's family's descent into poverty.
 The Ballymun Trilogy is a series of three plays about the process of change in Ballymun, written by Dermot Bolger and staged by the Axis Art Centre located close to the original site of McDonagh Tower. They are From These Green Heights, The Townlands of Brazil, and The Consequences of Lightning.
 Lynn Connolly followed up her memoir with a 2012 mystery set in the Ballymun flats entitled Elizabeth III'''.
 On an episode of the podcast Song Exploder, U2's Bono detailed the track "Cedarwood Road" focuses on the violence that youth faced in the Ballymun Flats community during the '70s.
 Ballymun also appears in the popular Irish film The Commitments where some of its residents become members of the titular band. This film was voted the best Irish film of the decade, favoured mostly for its wry humour. Some of the quips in the film directly reference this part of North Dublin.
 The flats feature in the opening scene of the 2004 film Adam & Paul'' which follows a day in the lives of two addicts looking to score heroin. Later on in the film  they return to the Ballymun flats, where they finally have success.

See also
 Local Authority Accommodation
 Pruitt–Igoe
 Cabrini–Green
 Divis Tower
Red Road Flats
Broadwater Farm

References

External links

 New Ballymun dot com
 Ballymun Regeneration Ltd

Buildings and structures in Dublin (city)
Housing in the Republic of Ireland
1969 establishments in Ireland
2004 disestablishments in Ireland
Demolished buildings and structures in Dublin
Apartment buildings in the Republic of Ireland